Mehde-Aue is a river of Lower Saxony, Germany. It flows into the Oste near Zeven.

See also
List of rivers of Lower Saxony

References

Rivers of Lower Saxony
Rivers of Germany